Karin Riediger-Heintges (born 2 August 1961) is a German former figure skater. She is the 1981 West German national champion. Riediger placed as high as sixth at the European Championships (1979) and ninth at the World Championships (1981). She was selected to represent West Germany at the 1980 Winter Olympics and finished 13th. Her skating club was Duisburger SCK.   

After retiring from competition, Riediger-Heintges became a coach at her former club, teaching young skaters. Her daughter, Isabel Heintges, was born in 1993.

Results

References 

 DSC Kaiserberg, Duisburg

1961 births
German female single skaters
Figure skaters at the 1980 Winter Olympics
Olympic figure skaters of West Germany
Sportspeople from Duisburg
Living people
20th-century German women